Toxocarpus is a genus of plants in the family Apocynaceae. It is native to China, the Himalayas, and Southeast Asia.

Species
Accepted species

Species listed as "unresolved," i.e., of uncertain affinities

formerly included 
Species moved to other genera (Calyptranthera, Genianthus, Jasminanthes, Pervillaea, Secamone)

References

Secamonoideae
Apocynaceae genera